Reuben Leonard Berry (July 3, 1934 – April 6, 1998) was an American gridiron football coach. He served as the head coach for the Saskatchewan Roughriders of the Canadian Football League (CFL) from 1983 to 1984.

A graduate of Southwest Missouri State University, Berry's coaching career began as an assistant at Fort Scott Community Junior College in Fort Scott, Kansas. In 1964 he moved to Sterling College, where he remained until March 1966 when he accepted the head coaching job at Fort Scott Community Junior College. Berry's tenure as FSCJC's head coached ended before he coached a single game when three months later he resigned to join the coaching staff at Southwest Missouri State.

From 1969 to 1970, Berry was the head coach at Missouri Southern State University, where he had an overall record of 4–15–1. After leaving MSSU, Berry served as the head coach at Northeastern Oklahoma A&M College and as the defensive line coach for the BC Lions.

On August 21, 1983, Berry replaced Joe Faragalli as head coach of the Saskatchewan Roughriders after a 1–5 start. The Roughriders missed the West Division playoffs in each of Berry's two seasons as head coach and on November 8, 1984, Berry was fired by the Roughriders.

Berry died on April 6, 1998, in Tulsa, Oklahoma. His son, Todd Berry, is the executive director of the American Football Coaches Association (AFCA).

Head coaching record

College

Professional

References

External links
 

1934 births
1998 deaths
American football quarterbacks
BC Lions coaches
Fort Scott Greyhounds football coaches
Missouri Southern Lions football coaches
Missouri State Bears football coaches
Missouri State Bears football players
Saskatchewan Roughriders coaches
Sterling Warriors football coaches
High school football coaches in Missouri
Missouri State University alumni
People from Lawrence County, Missouri
Sportspeople from Springfield, Illinois